María Anastasia Trejo (born 29 January 1980), better known as Mariana Juárez, is a Mexican professional boxer. She is a former two-division world champion, having held the WBC female flyweight title from 2011 to 2012 and the WBC female bantamweight title from 2017 to October 2020. As of November 2020, she is ranked as the world's second best active female bantamweight by The Ring and fifth by BoxRec, as well as the world's ninth best active female, pound for pound, by The Ring, and tenth by ESPN. She is the older sister of world champion boxer Lourdes Juárez.

Professional career
Juárez made her professional debut on 22 May 1998, scoring a second-round knockout (KO) victory over Virginia Esparza in Mexico City, Mexico.

Professional boxing record

References

External links

Living people
1980 births
Boxers from Tlaxcala
Mexican women boxers
Flyweight boxers
Super-flyweight boxers
Bantamweight boxers
World Boxing Council champions